Eye of the Beholder is a 1999 mystery thriller film that employs magical realism. The film, based on Marc Behm's novel of the same name and a remake of Claude Miller's 1983 French thriller Deadly Circuit, is directed and adapted by Stephan Elliott.

Starring Ewan McGregor and Ashley Judd, the film is an international co-production of Canada, the United Kingdom, and Australia.

Plot
Stephen Wilson aka "The Eye" (Ewan McGregor) is an intelligence agent whose current assignment is to track down the socialite son of his wealthy boss and find out what trouble he has gotten himself into. This leads him to Joanna Eris (Ashley Judd), a serial killer who is in a relationship with the son, whom she murders. Stephen is a witness to the crime.

At Penn Station in Pittsburgh, Eris commits yet another murder, enabling Stephen to finally corner her as he prepares to call for backup. Instead of turning her in, Stephen follows her in an effort to save her. He hallucinates constantly that his young daughter – whom he hasn't seen since his ex-wife took custody of her – is with him, and comes to think of Eris as a vulnerable, lost child.

Stephen follows her across the country and through several murders. He soon discovers that Eris and her father were very poor and that he had abandoned her, explaining her pathological hatred of men. When Eris helps a rich blind man (Patrick Bergin) in an airport, the two become involved, fall in love and become engaged, and it looks like they might even live a happy life together. Stephen, who has witnessed all of this, is desperate to keep her from killing again. While the couple is on the way to the chapel for the wedding, Stephen shoots out one of their tires and the car crashes, killing Eris' fiancé. Stephen follows a grief-stricken Eris as she takes off for the desert.

A drug addict named Gary (Jason Priestley) picks up Eris when her car dies and tries to seduce her; when she rebuffs his advances, he beats her unconscious and injects her with heroin so he can rape her while she is unconscious. Stephen arrives just in time to save Eris and gives Gary a thorough beating. Eris loses her unborn baby before fleeing to Alaska, with Stephen on her trail.

In Alaska, Stephen gains the courage to ask out Eris, as he is a frequent patron of the diner at which she waitresses. They have a few drinks in the evening, both getting emotional, and Eris mentions where she would like to be buried when she dies. She then says she has nothing to offer and that he should leave her alone. The next day the police, as well as Eris's psychiatrist (Geneviève Bujold), come to the diner to arrest her. Stephen tries to save her, taking her to his trailer. There she is horrified to find out that he has been following her. She shoots him with Stephen's revolver, although she doesn't realize that he had loaded it with blank cartridges. She flees and he follows her on a motorcycle. He catches up to her, but she crashes her car onto an ice-covered lake, breaking through the ice. He then quickly pulls her out of the car, but she is badly injured. Before she dies in his arms, she tells him, “I wish you love”.

Cast

Reception

Box office
Despite opening in the United States at number-one during the Super Bowl weekend and grossing $6 million on its opening weekend, Eye of the Beholder was a financial failure in theaters, grossing $16.5 million domestically and $1.1 million internationally for a worldwide total of $17.6 million against a $35 million budget.

Critical response
The film received largely negative reviews, with critics panning the improbable and muddled plot, as well as Elliott's direction. The site's consensus simply reads: "Improbable and muddled." On Metacritic, the film has a 29/100 rating based on reviews from 26 critics, indicating "generally unfavorable reviews". CinemaScore gave it a rating of "F" based on surveys from general audiences. It is notable for being the first film in over fifteen years since Bolero to receive that grade.

References

External links
 
 
 
 

1999 films
1990s thriller drama films
1990s mystery thriller films
1990s psychological thriller films
Canadian independent films
English-language Canadian films
Canadian mystery thriller films
Canadian thriller drama films
British thriller drama films
British independent films
British mystery thriller films
British psychological thriller films
Australian independent films
Australian thriller drama films
American remakes of French films
Films based on American novels
Films based on mystery novels
Films directed by Stephan Elliott
Films scored by Marius de Vries
Films set in New York City
Films set in Pittsburgh
Films set in San Francisco
Films shot in California
Films shot in Montreal
Films shot in New York City
Films shot in Pennsylvania
Films shot in San Francisco
Films shot in Washington, D.C.
British serial killer films
Village Roadshow Pictures films
Canadian serial killer films
Australian mystery thriller films
1999 independent films
1990s serial killer films
Australian serial killer films
1999 drama films
1990s English-language films
1990s Canadian films
1990s British films